The 2004 Acura Classic was a tennis tournament played on outdoor hard courts in San Diego, California, in the United States. It was part of Tier I of the 2004 WTA Tour. It was the 26th edition of the tournament was held from July 25 through August 1, 2004. Fourth-seeded Lindsay Davenport won the singles title and earned $189,000 first-prize money.

Finals

Singles

 Lindsay Davenport defeated  Anastasia Myskina 6–1, 6–1
 It was Davenport's 5th title of the year and the 78th of her career.

Doubles

 Cara Black /  Rennae Stubbs defeated  Virginia Ruano Pascual /  Paola Suárez 4–6, 6–1, 6–4
 It was Black's 5th title of the year and the 34th of her career. It was Stubbs's 4th title of the year and the 46th of her career.

References

External links
 ITF tournament edition details
 WTA Tournament draws

Acura Classic
Acura Classic
Southern California Open
Toshiba Classic
2004 in American tennis